David Morris (born 27 November 1988 in Kilkenny) is an Irish snooker player. In the 2015-2016 he was ranked as Ireland's number 3 player, after Fergal O'Brien and Ken Doherty.

Career

Early career
Aged 16, he reached the quarter finals of the U21 World Snooker Championships. He has been Irish champion at every level, winning the overall National championship every year from 2004 to 2006 (becoming the youngest ever winner in 2004). For 2006–07 he made his debut on the main tour, reaching the last 64 in two tournaments.

His best run in the 2007–2008 season was to the last 48 of the UK Championships, where he lost to Dave Harold (who also defeated him in qualifying for the previous year's Welsh Open). His only opening-round defeat that year was to Supoj Saenla in the World Championship, but despite this setback in the highest ranking-point event of the season he did enough to reach the top 64 of the rankings. He also won the Lucan Racing Irish Classic, an event staged by Fergal O'Brien featuring 8 (mostly Irish) professionals – Morris beat O'Brien 5–3 in the final.

In qualifying for the 2008/2009 Bahrain Championship Morris defeated countryman Rodney Goggins and Adrian Gunnell to reach the final qualifying round, where he lost 0–5 to Michael Holt, scoring just 10 points in the process (the lowest in a match of five or more frames since 1992)

2010/2011
He made an important breakthrough at the World Open by beating Robert Milkins 3–1 and Ben Woollaston 3–0 to qualify for the televised stages of an event for the first time. However, he was drawn against the current world champion Neil Robertson losing 3–1.

2011/2012
Morris left his best run of results in the ranking events until the last tournament of the season, the World Championship. He beat Kacper Filipiak, Mark Joyce and Alan McManus before losing to Barry Hawkins 4–10 in the final qualifying round. He played in 11 of the 12 PTC events throughout the season, with his best finish coming in Event 9 where he reached the last 16. He was placed 66 on the PTC Order of Merit and finished the season ranked world number 71, outside of the top 64 who automatically retain their places on the tour for the 2012–13 season.

2012/2013
Morris entered qualifying for the 2013 World Championship but lost 1–5 to Joe Swail in the second preliminary round. He played in Qualifying School to try and win a place back on the snooker tour and missed the final black for a 147 in his first match of the second event. Morris won through to the final round of that event but lost 0–4 to Ross Muir. He also reached the final round in the last event and this time succeeded by defeating Gareth Green 4–1 to earn a spot for the 2013–14 season.

2013/2014
Morris began the 2013–14 season by qualifying for the 2013 Wuxi Classic, where he reached the quarter-finals in a ranking event for the first time in his career. He beat Gary Wilson 5–4, Gerard Greene 5–2 and survived a tense 37-minute final frame decider to see off Ali Carter 5–4. He faced Matthew Stevens in the quarters and led 2–1 early on, but then did not score a point in the next three frames and went on to lose 5–2. Morris also had a very good run at the UK Championship with successes over Jamie Cope, 2002 world champion Peter Ebdon and Mitchell Travis, before losing 6–1 in the last 16 to Stuart Bingham. Morris was beaten in the first round of four more ranking events before the end of the season.

2014/2015
In the 2014–15 season, Morris qualified for the Wuxi Classic and the International Championship but lost in the first round of both tournaments. For the second successive year he reached the fourth round of the UK Championship, defeating Li Hang 6–4 in the first round before beating reigning world champion and world number one Mark Selby 6–4 in the second round, a victory that was described as the most significant win of his career to date. He went on to defeat David Gilbert 6–2 in the last 32, but lost 3–6 to Stephen Maguire in the last 16. Morris beat Joe O'Connor 4–0 at the Welsh Open, but lost by a reversal of this scoreline in the second round against Neil Robertson. He qualified for the Indian Open and the China Open, losing 4–0 to Graeme Dott in the second round of the former and 5–1 to Stephen Maguire in the first round of the latter. Morris ended the season at a career-high 51st in the world rankings.

2015/2016
After being knocked out in the third qualifying round of both the Australian Goldfields Open and Shanghai Masters, Morris could only win three more matches during the rest of the season. This meant he dropped off the tour as he finished the year 69th, outside the top 64 in the world rankings. Morris did not enter Q School.

Performance and rankings timeline

Career finals

Non-ranking finals: 1 (1 title)

Amateur finals: 5 (4 titles)

References

Notes

External links 

World Snooker profile
Profile on Global Snooker
Profile on Pro Snooker Blog

1988 births
Irish snooker players
Living people
People from Kilkenny (city)